The list of ship launches in 1677 includes a chronological list of some ships launched in 1677.


References

1677
Ship launches